WNCR may refer to:

WNCR-LD, a low-power television station (channel 21, virtual 41) licensed to serve Tarboro, North Carolina, United States
WGAR-FM, a radio station (99.5 FM) licensed to serve Cleveland, Ohio, United States, which carried the WNCR callsign from 1970–1975